Bozan is a village in the Şuhut District, Afyonkarahisar Province, Turkey. Its population is 130 (2021).

References

Villages in Şuhut District